Winnington is a small, mainly residential area of the town of Northwich in Cheshire, England.

Industry
Winnington is the home to Brunner Mond UK chemical works, where soda ash is created. Polythene, the material used in many  plastic items (e.g. plastic bags), was first made at the chemical works by Reginald O. Gibson and Eric W. Fawcett in 1933, during an experiment that 'went wrong'. Most residents in Winnington were employed by ICI (Imperial Chemical Industries); however, many people now work in the town centre, with Brunner Mond still employing hundreds of people. Most of the houses built closer to the ICI plant were built by the company to house their workers.

Winnington also has a combined heat and power station, providing electricity for Brunner Mond.

The Anderton Boat Lift, which lifts boats from the River Weaver navigation to the canal, is nearby.

The future
Winnington Village is a new development consisting of a range of family homes. Developers including Barratt Developments, Taylor Wimpey, Morris and Wilson Homes (Wilson Bowden) are looking to build a new community environment with the potential for a school and leisure facilities.

Climate

Sport
Winnington is home to Winnington Park Rugby Football Club that fields both a rugby union and rugby league team.

Also in Winnington is the Jubilee field (so named when it was given to the people of Northwich by Brunner Mond on their 50th anniversary in 1923), the playing fields are home to Winnington Avenue Football Club, with age groups in the Mid Cheshire Youth league from 8 years old to open age.

See also
 Winnington Hall
 Battle of Winnington Bridge (19 August 1659)

References

External links

Cheshire West and Chester
Villages in Cheshire
Northwich